Bathyglypta procera is a species of sea snail, a marine gastropod mollusk in the family Columbellidae, the dove snails.

Description

Distribution

References

 Pelorce J. (2017). Les Columbellidae (Gastropoda: Neogastropoda) de la Guyane française. Xenophora Taxonomy. 14: 4-21.

External links
  e, L. R. L. & Gracia, C. A. (2006). A new species of Suturoglypta from Colombia (Caenogastropoda, Columbellidae). Papeis Avulsos de Zoologia. 46(12): 133-137

Columbellidae
Gastropods described in 2006